The 1956 Philadelphia Eagles season was their 24th in the league. They failed to improve on their previous output of 4–7–1, winning only three games. The team failed to qualify for the playoffs for the seventh consecutive season.

Off Season 
The Eagles change coaches during the off season. Jim Trimble was fired on December 12, and they hired Hugh Devore. Jim Trimble's legacy is more connected to football products, thanks to his "slingshot" goal posts. In 1966 would design and market the idea. Today they are the common goal post at football games.

For the 6th year in a row the Eagles hold training camp in Hershey, Pennsylvania. They continued to hold training camp there until 1967.

NFL Draft 
The 1956 NFL Draft was held on November 29, 1955. The draft was 30 rounds long, with 12 teams making picks. A total of 360 players were selected. The Pittsburgh Steelers got this year's Lottery Bonus Pick and with it they selected Gary Glick a Quarterback that went to Colorado State University.

The 1955 Eagles finished with a 4–7–1 record and will get to pick 4th or 5th in the rounds with the Chicago Cardinals. With their first round pick the Eagles selected Bob Pellegrini He was featured on the cover of the November 7, 1955, edition of Sports Illustrated magazine. a Center from the University of Maryland, College Park. The Eagles made a total of 30 picks in this year's draft.

Player selections 
The table shows the Eagles selections and what picks they had that were traded away and the team that ended up with that pick. It is possible the Eagles' pick ended up with this team via another team that the Eagles made a trade with.
Not shown are acquired picks that the Eagles traded away.

Schedule 

Note: Intra-conference opponents are in bold text.

Standings

Roster 
(All time List of Philadelphia Eagles players in franchise history)

 + = Was a Starter in the Pro-Bowl

References 

Philadelphia Eagles seasons
Philadelphia Eagles
Philadelphia